Lee Jeong-Jae (born ) is a South Korean male weightlifter, competing in the 77 kg category and representing South Korea at international competitions. He competed at world championships, most recently at the 2006 World Weightlifting Championships.

Major results

References

1981 births
Living people
South Korean male weightlifters
Place of birth missing (living people)
Weightlifters at the 2006 Asian Games
Asian Games medalists in weightlifting
Asian Games silver medalists for South Korea
Medalists at the 2006 Asian Games
21st-century South Korean people